Inachidae is a family of crabs, containing 39 genera:

Achaeopsis Stimpson, 1857
Achaeus Leach, 1815
Anisonotus A. Milne-Edwards, 1879
Anomalothir Miers, 1879
Bothromaia Williams & Moffitt, 1991
Calypsachaeus Manning & Holthuis, 1981
Camposcia Latreille, 1829
Capartiella Manning & Holthuis, 1981
Chalaroacheus De Man, 1902
Chorinachus Griffin & Tranter, 1986
Coryrhynchus Kingsley, 1879
Cyrtomaia Miers, 1886
Dorhynchus Wyville Thomson, 1873
Dumea Loh & Ng, 1999
Encephaloides Wood-Mason & Alcock, 1891
Ephippias Rathbun, 1918
Ergasticus A. Milne-Edwards, 1882
Ericerodes Rathbun, 1897
Erileptus Rathbun, 1893
Eucinetops Stimpson, 1860
Eurypodius Guérin, 1825
Grypacheus Alcock, 1895
Inachus Weber, 1795
Litosus Loh & Ng, 1999
Macrocheira De Haan, 1839
Macropodia Leach, 1814
Metoporhaphis Stimpson, 1860
Oncinopus De Haan, 1839
Paratymolus Miers, 1879
Physacheus Alcock, 1895
Platymaia Miers, 1886
Pleistacantha Miers, 1879
Podochela Stimpson, 1860
Prosphorachaeus Takeda & Miyake, 1969
Rhinospinosa Griffin & Tranter, 1986
Stenorhynchus Lamarck, 1818
Sunipea Griffin & Tranter, 1986
Trichoplatus A. Milne-Edwards, 1879
Vitjazmaia Zarenkov, 1994

References

External links

Majoidea
Decapod families